William Finch  (18 January 169125 December 1766) of Charlewood, Hertfordshire, was a British diplomat and Whig politician who sat in the House of Commons from 1727 to 1761. He was considered an indolent diplomat and became an opponent of Walpole, but maintained his post in the Royal Household for over 20 years until he began to lose his senses.

Early life
Finch was the second son of Daniel Finch, 2nd Earl of Nottingham, and his second wife Anne Hatton. He matriculated at Christ Church, Oxford on 4 March, 1707, aged 16, and became a student of Inner Temple in 1710.

Career
When Lord Carteret went to Sweden as ambassador from 1719 to 1720, Finch accompanied him as his  secretary. Carteret returned to Britain and secured Finch's appointment as envoy there in his place until 1724. Finch was then appointed envoy to United Provinces until 1728.

At the  1727 Finch was returned as Member of Parliament for Cockermouth on the interest of his brother-in-law the Duke of Somerset. He voted with the government, but was sent on another mission as minister to the Netherlands from 1733 to 1734. He had been admonished by Carteret previously for lack of diligence, and it was considered that his indolent ministry had put the Netherlands into the hands of France. Walpole sent his brother Horace to The Hague as ambassador on a special mission, and Finch took umbrage and asked to be recalled. He was returned unopposed at the 1734 British general election and went into opposition against Walpole. He was returned for Cockermouth again at the 1741 British general election and after the fall of Walpole in 1742, he and his brother Edward obtained posts in the Royal Household by their connection to Lord Carteret. He was appointed Vice-Chamberlain of the Household and a Member of the Privy Council. He survived in post after Carteret was dismissed in 1744 and again after Carteret tried unsuccessfully to form an administration in 1746, when there was a bid to purge public offices of his adherents. He remained in post until 1765. He was returned as MP for Cockermouth at the 1747 British general election, but at the 1754 British general election he was encouraged to take a seat elsewhere and was not returned.

Finch was returned as MP for Bewdley  on the Lyttelton interest at a by-election on  5 February 1755. He did not stand again. He began to lose his sanity and in 1765 he was pensioned off from his post at the Royal Household.

Marriage and Family
Finch  married Lady Anne Douglas, daughter of James Douglas, 2nd Duke of Queensberry on 25 January 1733. She died without issue on 26 October 1741. He married as his second wife Charlotte Fermor, daughter of Thomas Fermor, 1st Earl of Pomfret on 9 August 1746. They had a son and four daughters:

 Charlotte Finch (b. 1 September 1747).
 Sophia Finch (b. 17 October 1748), married Captain Charles Fielding in 1772 and had issue.
Frances Finch (23 September 1749 –1765).
Henrietta Finch (b. 28 December 1750).
George Finch, 9th Earl of Winchilsea (4 November 1752 – 2 August 1826).

Finch's wife was a governess to the royal children. In his madness, Finch, had beaten her and thrown her down stairs, and as a result they were separated by articles. However they still remained on civil terms.   

Finch died on 25 December 1766. He was succeeded by his son George. One of his daughters was Sophia Finch

References

External Links 
Burkes Peerage (1939 edition), s.v. Winchelsea.

 

 

 

  

1691 births
1766 deaths
Members of the Parliament of Great Britain for English constituencies
Members of the Privy Council of Great Britain
Younger sons of earls
British MPs 1727–1734
British MPs 1734–1741
British MPs 1741–1747
British MPs 1747–1754
British MPs 1754–1761
William
Ambassadors of Great Britain to Sweden
Ambassadors of Great Britain to the Netherlands